Leiurus is a genus of scorpion of the family Buthidae. The most common species, L. quinquestriatus, is also known under the common name Deathstalker. It is distributed widely across North Africa and the Middle East, including the western and southern Arabian Peninsula and southeastern Turkey. At least one species occurs in West Africa (northern Cameroon).

Taxonomy
The genus was introduced in 1828 by C.G. Ehrenberg (in Hemprich & Ehrenberg 1828), originally as a subgenus of the genus Androctonus. It was finally elevated to genus rank by M. Vachon in 1949.
The genus was long considered to be monotypic, containing a single species, L. quinquestriatus, but research since 2002 has shown that there are indeed several species.

Diversity
Currently five species are recognized within this genus, but their validity is under discussion. F. Kovařík (2007) suspected that L. jordanensis and L. savanicola are possible synonyms of L. quinquestriatus.

Leiurus abdullahbayrami Yagmur, Koc & Kunt, 2009
Leiurus hebraeus Lowe, Yagmur & Kovaric, 2014
Leiurus jordanensis Lourenço, Modry & Amr, 2002
Leiurus nasheri Kovařík, 2007
Leiurus quinquestriatus (Ehrenberg, 1828) (type species)
Leiurus savanicola Lourenço, Qi & Cloudsley-Thompson, 2006

General characteristics
Members of Leiurus are generally moderately sized scorpions that show a typical buthid habitus with gracile pedipalp chelae and a slender metasoma. The vesicle is bulbous and proportionally large in some species. The cephalothorax and mesosoma shows distinct granulation. Characteristically the tergites of the mesosoma bear five distinct, longitudinal carinae (ridges). The base color is generally yellow with brown to blackish areas extending over various parts of the animal, depending on species.

Toxicity
The venom of L. quinquestriatus is among the most potent scorpion toxins. It severely affects the cardiac and pulmonary systems. Human fatalities, often children, have been confirmed by clinical reports. The median lethal dose of venom (LD50) for this species was measured at 0.16 - 0.50 mg/kgmice.
The toxicity of the other species is also potentially high to life-threatening, but reliable data are currently not available.

Habitat
Most species live in semi-arid to arid regions, including the Sahara and Arabian deserts. At least one species occurs in savannah environment. Sparsely vegetated and sandy or rocky substrates are preferred. The scorpions live in shallow burrows in sand or beneath rocks.

In captivity
Members of the genus Leiurus are often bred in captivity and traded. Due to their extreme toxicity, keeping these species is strictly recommended to only very experienced and/or professionally trained people.

References

External links
 Images of Leiurus quinquestriatus. Exotics.nl

Buthidae

Scorpion genera
Scorpions of Africa
Taxa named by Christian Gottfried Ehrenberg